This is a list of the reptile species recorded in Lesotho. There are 17 reptile species in Lesotho, of which 0 are critically endangered, 0 are endangered, 0 are vulnerable and 2 are near-threatened. This list is derived from the Reptile Database which lists species of reptile and includes those reptiles that have recently been classified as extinct (since 1500 AD). The taxonomy and naming of the individual species is based on those currently used by The Reptile Database as of 22 September 2011 and supplemented by the Common Names and taxonomy from the IUCN where no Reptile Database article was available.

The following tags are used to highlight specific species' conservation status as assessed by the IUCN:

Order: Squamata (Snakes & Lizards)

Family: Gekkonidae (Geckos)
Genus: Afroedura
  Inland Rock Gecko Afroedura karroica
  Drakensberg Gecko Afroedura nivaria
Family: Cordylidae (Spinytail Lizards)
Genus: Cordylus
  Lang's Crag Lizard Cordylus langi
  Drakensberg Crag Lizard Cordylus melanotus
 sub-Species Cordylus melanotus subviridis
Family: Lacertidae (True Lizards)
Genus: Pedioplanis
  Burchell's Sand Lizard Pedioplanis burchelli
Genus: Trachylepis
  Montane Speckled Skink Trachylepis punctatissima
Genus: Tropidosaura
  Cottrell's Mountain Lizard Tropidosaura cottrelli NT
  Essex's Mountain Lizard Tropidosaura essexi NT
Family: Colubridae
Genus: Dasypeltis
  Common Egg-eater Dasypeltis scabra
Family: Lamprophiidae
Genus: Lycodonomorphus
  Common Brown Water Snake Lycodonomorphus rufulus
 sub-Species Lycodonomorphus rufulus mlanjensis
Genus: Montaspis
  Cream-spotted Mountain Snake Montaspis gilvomaculata
Genus: Prosymna
  Sundevall's Shovel-snout Prosymna sundevalli
Genus: Psammophylax
  Spotted Skaapsteker Psammophylax rhombeatus
Family: Elapidae
Genus: Hemachatus
  Rinkhals Hemachatus haemachatus
Genus: Naja
  Western Barred Spitting Cobra Naja nigricincta
 sub-Species Naja nigricincta woodi
  Cape Cobra Naja nivea
Family: Viperidae (Adders & Vipers)
Genus: Bitis
  Mountain Adder Bitis atropos

References

See also
List of chordate orders
List of regional reptiles lists

Lesotho
Reptiles

Lesotho